Plant variety may refer to:
*Variety (botany), a formal rank, in taxonomic nomenclature, below subspecies
Colloquially (and historically):
Cultivar, especially of grapes and rice
Hybrid (biology), more generally
Any form (botany) (a taxonomic rank below variety)
Plant variety (law), a non-taxonomic term of legal recognition

See also
 Varietal, a wine labeled by the grape variety used to make it
 Variety (disambiguation), other types of variety